Nathan Weston Spaulding (September 24, 1829 – October 8, 1903) was an American politician and landowner who served as the 15th Mayor of Oakland, California (1871-1873). He was also an inventor, holding a patent for an adjustable circular saw tooth. He created the Pacific Saw Manufacturing Company, which manufactured and sold all types of saws. Spaulding planted the Eucalyptus Tree Row in  Carmel Valley, California to establish an entry to his to his Rancho Los Laureles ranch.

Early life
Spaulding was born in North Anson, Maine on September 24, 1829, the oldest of eight boys. His father, Walter Spaulding (1801-1857) was a teacher and a "practical-mechanic." He was a descendant of Edward Spaulding (1600-1670), who was an early settler in the colony of Norfolk, Massachusetts. Spaulding was a large man at 6'3" and 220 lbs. On May 25, 1854, he married Mary Theresa Clinkenbeard (February 26, 1838 – August 13, 1904) in Campo Seco, California, the daughter of William Clinkenbeard of Kentucky. Nathan and Mary had had 10 children, but 3 died in infancy and only 6 outlived them.

Career
While on the East Coast, Spaulding learned the trades of carpenter, builder and millwright from his father and uncle. By the age of 20, he worked as a carpenter in Boston and in Portland, Maine.

In 1851, he sailed from New York for the gold fields of California by way of the Panama Canal, where he pioneered in the building of mills and flumes on the Mokelumne River in Calaveras County. He worked at the first quartz sawmill ever built in the state and then built and managed the first hotel in Campo Seco, California by, the Mokelumne River in 1852, where he met his wife. Shortly afterwards, a fire destroyed the hotel that all but destroyed the town. Nathan and Mary moved then moved to the town of Clinton in Amador County, Northern California, and built another sawmill and two bridges, which spanned the Mokelumne River.

In 1859, Spaulding and family moved to Sacramento and opened a store that manufactured and repaired saws. In 1861, Spaulding moved his factory to San Francisco where he invented and patented his own type of circular saw (No. 33,270), called the Spaulding Saw, with adjustable teeth (inserted-tooth). A Saw-teeth patent (No. 192,090) was invented in June 19, 1877. The saw revolutionized the circular saw business and made Spaulding a household name. In 1864, he became associated with Charles P. Sheffield and James Patterson, where they established the Pacific Saw Manufacturing Company, at 113 & 115 Pine Street, which manufactured and sold all types of saws. They later built a plant at 17 & 19 Fremont Street. He went on to become president and manager of the N. W. Spaulding & Brothers in Chicago, Illinois with two of his brothers that made large circular saws with inserted teeth, chisel-bits and saw-mill machinery.

In the late 1860s, Don José Manuel Boronda's son Juan de Mata Boronda, who had inherited the Rancho Los Laureles, sold it to Spaulding of San Francisco, who placed the rancho under the management of his brother-in-law, Kinzea Stone Clinkenbeard, who began innovations. A row of eucalyptus trees was planted, between 1874 and 1881, by Clinkenbeard for Spaulding to establish an entry to his Rancho Los Laureles Ranch. The row consists of 33 historic, 130 year-old-trees between 36 and 120 inches in diameter. There are 6 along the 317-ft. Carmel Valley Road; 14 along the 370-ft north side of Boronda Road and 13 along the 581-ft south side of Boronda Road. All the trees are located on the public right-of-way and stand in their original positions. During his ownership (1874-1881) he made modern farming and dairying improvements, as well as irrigation and fencing were introduced for the first time in Carmel Valley. He later sold the property to the Pacific Improvement Company, owner of the Hotel Del Monte in Monterey, which wanted the water rights as well as a game preserve for hotel guests.

Move to Oakland
In 1868, the Spauldings moved to Oakland. He built two mansions, one at 9th and Madison Streets and later one in Highland Park, East Oakland. He was a Unitarian and member of the Independent Church of Oakland, where he was a director and president of the society.

Public Offices

Spaulding was elected to the City Council of Oakland in 1869 and 1870, 1873 and 1874, where, as chairman of the streets committee, he played a major role in securing Oakland's status as "being one of the most conveniently and beneficially laid out, best lighted and best macademized cities in the Union." Spaulding was the Oakland Mayor from 1871-1873. He was elected twice as mayor, in 1871 and 1872. The second time he ran, he was unopposed. While he was mayor, the site of the present-day city hall building was purchased for $17,000.

Spaulding initiated the move to bring the county seat from San Leandro to Oakland, which was finally approved by the state legislature in 1874, with the county accepting Franklin and Washington Squares as sites for a new Courthouse and Hall of Records. He donated 100% of his salary to charity while he was mayor. He also served for four years as Assistant United States Treasurer of San Francisco following his appointment by President James A. Garfield in 1881. He served from May, 1881 to August, 1885.

As a member of the Republican party, he served as an alternate delegate to the Republican National Convention from California in 1888. Leland Stanford selected him as one of the trustees of Stanford University. He later stepped down to make room for Jane Lathrop Stanford to become a trustee. He was also a director of the Industrial Home for the Adult Blind on Telegraph Avenue, and Thirty-sixth Street.

Masons

Spaulding was a high-ranking Mason and reached the rank of a 33rd-degree Mason. He served as the grand high priest of the Alameda Chapter of the Royal Arch Masons, attaining the rank of grand high priest of California. He was founder and first master of the Free & Accepted Masons Oakland Lodge #188 and was elected six times as treasurer. He was close friends with his fellow Masons Enoch H. Pardee and his son George Pardee.

Death and Burial

Spaulding died of malarial fever in New Britain, Connecticut on October 8, 1903, while on a business trip. His body was brought back to Oakland where he was buried in Mountain View Cemetery (Oakland, California) in the Spaulding family lot in plot 6. The Oakland Lodge, No. 188, Free & Accepted Masons would conduct the funeral. Also buried there are his wife Mary, daughter Esther, son William, daughter Nancy and her husband, Edward, daughter Lydia, son George, and grandson Merrill (son of Madora). In March, 2014, the local Masons re-landscaped the lot, and rededicated Spaulding's grave with a new marker.

Publications

 Table for the measurement of logs (1928)

References

1829 births
1903 deaths
California Republicans
Mayors of Oakland, California
People from Somerset County, Maine
People from Carmel Valley, California
19th-century American politicians